Tösens is a municipality in the district of Landeck in the Austrian state of Tyrol located 14 km south of the city of Landeck. The main source of income is tourism.

References

Cities and towns in Landeck District